John Bower "Bouse" Hutton (October 24, 1877 – October 27, 1962) was a Canadian ice hockey goaltender who played for the Ottawa Hockey Club. Hutton also played lacrosse as a goaltender for the Ottawa Capitals, and Canadian football as a fullback for the Ottawa Rough Riders. Playing at the highest level of competition in each sport, Hutton won championships with all three teams.

After his career as a player, Hutton was an ice hockey coach in Ottawa for several years. He was inducted into the Hockey Hall of Fame in 1963.

Career

Hutton began his ice hockey career with the Ottawa Hockey Club of the Canadian Amateur Hockey League (CAHL) in the 1899 season with two appearances. The 1900 season was Hutton's first full season with Ottawa. Hutton finished the season with a 2.70 goals-against average, in a time when double-digit scores were very common. In the 1901 season, Hutton played all eight games, and continued to have a low goals-against average, of 2.50. In the 1902 season, Hutton recorded two shutouts, and finished with a 1.70 goals-against average.

In the 1903 season, his average increased to 3.80; however, in the CAHL playoffs, Hutton posted a 1–0–1 record, with one shutout and a 0.50 goals-average, while in the Stanley Cup finals, Hutton posted a 2–0 record, with a 2.00 goals-against average as Ottawa won the Stanley Cup. After the Stanley Cup win, the Ottawa Hockey Club became known as the Silver Seven, after the silver nuggets given to the players after their Stanley Cup victory by a team official who was a silver mine owner.

In the 1904 season, Hutton won all of Ottawa's four games, but the team withdrew from the CAHL mid-season before completing its eight-game schedule. Hutton appeared in Stanley Cup challenges only, posting a 6–1–1 record, with one shutout and a 2.90 goals-against average. At the end of the CAHL season, the Stanley Cup trustees ruled that Ottawa would retain the Cup.

Hutton played lacrosse during the summer months. Hutton won the first Minto Cup, then awarded to Canada's top senior men's lacrosse team, in 1901 with the Ottawa Capitals. In 1904, the club he played for was ruled to be a professional team and Hutton lost his amateur status to play ice hockey.  In addition, he had a severe case of quinsy and he retired from ice hockey. After his retirement, Hutton won another Minto Cup with the Capitals in 1906. The team toured England after the win, and won 23 out of 24 games.

In 1909, Hutton returned for one more season of ice hockey with the professional Ottawa Senators of the Federal Amateur Hockey League (FAHL). He appeared in five games.

Hutton also played rugby football. In the fall of 1902, Hutton won the Canadian football championship with Ottawa Rough Riders.

Career statistics

Regular season

Playoffs

* Stanley Cup Champion.

See also
Percy LeSueur

References

Citations

Bibliography

External links
 

1877 births
1962 deaths
Canadian lacrosse players
Hockey Hall of Fame inductees
Ice hockey people from Ottawa
Ottawa Senators (original) players
Stanley Cup champions
Canadian ice hockey goaltenders